Power to the People! (PaP) is a political party in Italy. It was launched in December 2017 as a left-wing joint electoral list of anti-capitalist parties and movements which ran in the 2018 general election.

In its manifesto, PaP's membership is described as "social and political, anti-liberal and anti-capitalist, communist, socialist, environmentalist, feminist, secular, pacifist, libertarian and southernist left-wing", whose goal as a coalition is "to create real democracy, through daily practices, self-governance experiments, socialisation of knowing and popular participation".

History 
The coalition was initially proposed by Ex OPG Je so' pazzo, a social centre in Naples. The proposal was endorsed by other social centers in the country, local committees and associations and finally some established parties whereas the idea of building a party and/or list was born during the Je so' pazzo Festival – 2016, which had as its name "Let's Build the Popular Power", held in Naples from 9 to 11 September 2016. The following year from 7 to 10 September 2017, there was in Naples the Je so' pazzo Festival – 2017, which had as its name "Power to the People!".

On 18 November 2017, Je so' pazzo's activists held a national assembly for the construction of a truly democratic movement that would give representation to social battles and to the ideas of individuals, social centers, associations and parties that felt themselves to be without representation. On 17 December, the coalition was officially launched with the support of the two main Italian communist parties, the Communist Refoundation Party (PRC) and the Italian Communist Party (PCI). Contextually, that same day Viola Carofalo, a Naples-based university researcher in philosophy who had been a long-time activist of Ex OPG Je so' pazzo, was chosen as national spokesperson and as political leader on 6 January 2018. In the 2018 general election on 4 March, PaP obtained 1.1% of the vote and no seats.

On 18 March, PaP held a national assembly in which it was decided to continue its program. In January 2019, PaP considered running either independently or in a wider coalition in the next European parliament election, but it ultimately decided not to run.

In July 2021 senator Matteo Mantero, elected with the Five Star Movement, joined the party, giving it representation in the Italian Parliament.

Composition 
While it currently contains three main parties, PaP was originally composed of eight main parties other than Ex OPG Je so' pazzo.

Former members 

Additionally, PaP includes a number of little parties, movements, social centers, local trade unions, associations and committees, notably including Clash City Workers, Popular Front, Revolutionary Pirate Movement, Eurostop, representatives of the No TAV movement, the No TAP movement, the No MUOS movement and the No TRIV movement. PaP is also connected with The Other Europe (AET), an electoral list organised by intellectuals, Left Ecology Freedom (SEL) and the PRC for the 2014 European Parliament election, which elected three Members of the European Parliament (MEPs), including PRC's Eleonora Forenza, who along with SEL's Curzio Maltese is still affiliated with AET. SEL was later incorporated in the Italian Left (SI) and ran within the Free and Equal (LeU) list in the 2018 election.

International relations 
After its founding in December 2017, PaP took inspiration from Momentum, the organisation supporting Jeremy Corbyn's leadership of the Labour Party in the United Kingdom and La France Insoumise, whose leader Jean-Luc Mélenchon spoke of a "common adventure for the construction of a people's alternative for Europe". In April 2018, PaP "lent its support" to Maintenant le Peuple, an alternative Europarty started by Mélenchon, Catarina Martins and Pablo Iglesias Turrión of the French La France Insoumise, Portuguese Left Bloc and Spanish Podemos respectively which was later joined by the Danish Red-Green Alliance, Finnish Left Alliance and Swedish Left Party. PaP called Maintenant le Peuple "a very important call proposed by three of the most popular alternatives from Europe [Left Bloc, Podemos and La France Insoumise], which we can not ignore".

Endorsements 
PaP has been endorsed by the following public figures:
 Sabina Guzzanti
 Vandana Shiva
 Citto Maselli
 Vauro Senesi
 Ken Loach
 Moni Ovadia
 Camila Vallejo
 Jean-Luc Mélenchon
 Sahra Wagenknecht
 Evo Morales

Election results

Italian Parliament

Regional Councils

Leadership 
 National spokesperson: Viola Carofalo (17 December 2017 – 12 May 2021); Giorgio Cremaschi (12 January 2019 – 12 May 2021); Giuliano Granato (12 May 2021 – present); Marta Collot (12 May 2021 – present)

Logos 
PaP used different logos:

References

External links
Potere al Popolo! – Noi ci stiamo, chi accetta la sfida? – official website
Potere al Popolo – official Facebook page

2017 establishments in Italy
Communist parties in Italy
Eurosceptic parties in Italy
Far-left politics in Italy
Left-wing politics in Italy
Political parties established in 2017